Donald M. Gordon Chinguacousy Park, colloquially known as Chinguacousy Park, is a large  park in the Bramalea section of Brampton, Ontario, Canada. It is bounded by Queen Street East on the southeast, Bramalea Road on the northeast, and Central Park Drive on the north and west sides. Terry Fox Stadium (Brampton) in the north of the park, sometimes called Terry Fox Track and Field Stadium, has a track and field oval surrounding an artificial turf field with Canadian Football markings and stands for about 1000 spectators. It is used for various Canadian football and soccer matches as well as track and field competitions.

Chinguacousy is said to mean "Young Pine River". The park is named for Donald M. Gordon, who helped form the parks and recreation programs in Brampton, as well as Chippewa Chief Shinguacose ( 1858).

History
In 1970, the City of Brampton bought the  farm from the Crawford family, with the intention of building a large park, paying for land and facilities from the proceeds of subdivision agreements.

Revitalization
In 2014, the federal, provincial and municipal government each agreed to contribute $8.2 million towards the park, to be used for renovations and new construction.

Facilities
The park's sport facilities include a curling facility, winterized tennis courts, beach volleyball courts, boating, skiing and track-and-field facilities. They also offer mini-putt golf, formal gardens and greenhouse, pedal boats, pony rides, petting zoo and barn, splash pad and children's playground, and a BMX/skateboard park.  In winter 2017, a  canal-style skating trail opened.  It converts to a reflective fountain in summer.

Mount Chinguacousy
Mount Chinguacousy is a small  alpine skiing and snowboarding hill located in the park, near the intersection of Bramalea Road and Central Park Drive. It features a magic carpet ski lift, beginner slopes on either side of the lift and a chalet and rental shop at the base of the hill. It has snow-making facilities and night skiing, and is the only ski hill in Brampton.
The hill is man-made, but contrary to popular belief, is not a former landfill site, but is constructed from the excavations for basements of many early Bramalea houses.

Events

There are a variety of summer camps offered for children and teens at this park.  They are offered through Brampton Parks and Recreation Department. The park is also host to annual carnivals.  City of Brampton hosts a Tough Run  adventure race every September.  The park also hosts outdoor movie nights during the summer.

See also
 List of ski areas and resorts in Canada

References

External links
 Donald M. Gordon Chinguacousy Park - official site
 Resort Statistics
 Mount Chinguacousy - City of Brampton

Geography of Brampton
Protected areas of the Regional Municipality of Peel
Tourist attractions in Brampton
Municipal parks in Ontario
Ski areas and resorts in Ontario